Dinner at Eight is a 1989 American made-for-television comedy-drama film directed by Ron Lagomarsino and written by Tom Griffin. It is a remake of the 1933 film Dinner at Eight, which was based on the 1932 play of the same name by George S. Kaufman and Edna Ferber. The film stars Lauren Bacall, Charles Durning, Ellen Greene, Harry Hamlin, John Mahoney and Marsha Mason. The film premiered on TNT on December 11, 1989.

Plot

Cast
 Lauren Bacall as Carlotta Vance
 Charles Durning as Dan Packard
 Ellen Greene as Kitty Packard
 Harry Hamlin as Larry Renault
 John Mahoney as Oliver Jordan
 Marsha Mason as Millicent Jordan
 Joel Brooks as Max Kane
 Stacy Edwards as Paula Jordan
 Tim Kazurinsky as Ed Loomis
 Bernadette Birkett as Hattie
 Ralph Bruneau as Dr. Wayne Talbot
 Lenore Kasdorf as Lucy Talbot
 William Newman as Alf
 Jane Alden as Ms. Copeland
 Loyda Ramos as Tina
 Julia Sweeney as Miss Wendell
 Kelly Connell as Dan's Assistant
 Richard Seff as Fosdick
 John Fleck as Plant Person
 Eddie Castrodad as Bobby
 Ben Meyerson as Waiter
 Theodore Lehmann as Gustave
 Rodney Scott Hudson as Wine Steward
 Bob Legionaire as Norman Stengel 
 Edward Penn as Fitch
 Richard Cummings Jr. as Hatfield
 Joseph Kell as Ernest

References

External links
 
 
 

1989 television films
1989 films
American comedy-drama films
1989 comedy-drama films
TNT Network original films
Television remakes of films
American films based on plays
Films based on works by Edna Ferber
Films directed by Ron Lagomarsino
American comedy-drama television films
1980s English-language films
1980s American films